Scopula virgulata, the streaked wave, is a moth of the family Geometridae. The species was first described by Denis & Ignaz Schiffermüller in 1775. It is found from most of Europe to central Asia and northern Mongolia.

Adults are on wing from late July to August in one generation per year.

The larvae feed on Carex and Inula species. Larvae can be found from August to June. It overwinters in the larval stage.

Subspecies
Scopula virgulata virgulata western, central, southern and eastern Europe, except the northern Baltic region and southern Finland)
Scopula virgulata rossica Djakonov, 1926 (northern Baltic region, southern Finland, Gotland)
Scopula virgulata substrigaria (Staudinger, 1900) (Caucasus, western Sibiria, Altai, Mongolia)
Scopula virgulata subtilis Prout, 1935 (Russian Far East)
Scopula virgulata albicans Prout, 1934 (Japan)

References

External links
Streaked wave at UKMoths
Lepiforum e.V.

Moths described in 1775
virgulata
Moths of Asia
Moths of Europe
Taxa named by Michael Denis
Taxa named by Ignaz Schiffermüller